Regensburg is a Landkreis (district) in Bavaria, Germany. It is bounded by (from the north, in clockwise direction) the districts of Schwandorf, Cham, Straubing-Bogen, Kelheim and Neumarkt. The city of Regensburg is enclosed by it, but is not part of the district; nonetheless it is its administrative seat.

History
The region became a part of Bavaria in the late 12th century, when the line of the counts of Regensburg and Stefling came to an end. While Regensburg became a Free Imperial City (meaning subordinate to the emperor only), the surrounding lands were Bavarian property.

While the district dates back to medieval times, its present shape was established in 1972.

Geography

The district is located on either side of the Danube. Another major river is the Regen which joins the Danube in Regensburg. In its northernmost parts the district is occupied by the foothills of the Bavarian Forest.

Coat of arms
The coat of arms displays:
 the blue and white checked pattern of Bavaria
 the red and white arms of the Regensburg abbey
 the red cross from the arms of Prüfening Abbey

Towns and municipalities

Notable people
 Alexander Braun, Botanist
 Edith Kellnhauser (1933–2019), nursing scientist, educator, and writer
 Wolfram Menschick (1937–2010), Catholic church musician, composer and academic teacher

References

External links

 Official website (German)

 
Districts of Bavaria